Hans Høegh (1 September 1926 – 31 October 2010) was a Norwegian businessman and organizational leader.

Høegh was President of the Norwegian Red Cross from 1975 to 1981. Thereafter he was General Secretary of the League of Red Cross Societies in Geneve. From 1988 to 1993 was Høegh Assistant Secretary General in the United Nations. He served as Special Representative of the UN Secretary General for the Promotion of the United Nations Decade of Disabled Persons between 1988 and 1993.

References 

Norwegian businesspeople
1926 births
2010 deaths
Presidents of the Norwegian Red Cross
Norwegian officials of the United Nations